, better known mononymously as , is a Japanese entertainer signed to GATE. Since 2009, she has recorded music under the stage name Becky♪♯.

History
Becky was born in Kanagawa Prefecture to a Japanese mother and an English father, Simon Rabone. She has one younger sister, dancer Jessica "JJ" Rabone. Until at least 2011, Becky held dual citizenship status in both Japan and the United Kingdom. Although The Japan Times previously erroneously reported her full name as "Rebecca Eri Ray Vaughan", Australian airline Jetstar Airways, having used her in advertisements and promotions aimed towards Japanese audiences, gives her full name as being "Rebecca-Eri Rabone", this surname matching that used by her father and sister; the error arises from the fact that 'Rabone' and 'Ray Vaughan' would be spelled the same way in Japanese. 
She debuted as a regular on the popular children's show Oha-Suta in 1999 reading out the English names of various Pokémon characters in a section of the show called Pokémon: The World. She became a popular mascot of the show, and eventually started landing spots on various Japanese variety shows. On television, she has also appeared in numerous commercials and has lent her voice to the characters of many anime shorts and movies.

She graduated from Tokyo's Asia University with a degree in business administration on 15 March 2006.

In January 2016, Becky's reputation as Japan's most popular female personality took a hit after Japanese tabloid Shukan Bunshun revealed that she had an affair with musician Enon Kawatani who at the time was married. Following the scandal, Kawatani announced that he officially divorced his wife. In order to appease the public backlash and as a condition for her comeback to show business in Japan, Becky tried to officially apologize to Kawatani's wife. However, having no direct channel to her, Becky contacted the Shukan Bunshun'''s editorial department instead. Shukan Bunshun published the full contents of Becky’s letter at the end of April 2016. The letter acknowledged her affair yet also implied that she had not seen Kawatani since the scandal broke and that she no longer had feelings for him. As a result of her apologies, Becky was to make her comeback with an appearance on TBS. In her first appearance back on TV, she appeared on Full Chorus - Music is Full Chorus on the cable channel BS Skyperfect TV.

On 13 February 2019, Becky announced that she had married Yomiuri Giants coach Yasuyuki Kataoka.

Filmography

Variety shows
Becky is currently a regular panelist on the following programs:Pokémon Sunday on TXHanamaru Market on TBSGekko Ongaku-dan on TBSTensai! Shimura Zoo on NTVKiyoshi to Kono Yoru on NHKWatashi no Kimochi on NHKNakai Masahiro no kin'yōbi no Sma-tachi e on TBSTabegoro Manma! on NTVPittanko Kankan on TBS as a semi-regularSekai no Hate Made Itte-Q! on NTV (2007-2016)Nazotoki Battle TORE! on NTV

Television seriesChurasan (NHK, 2001)Ultraman Cosmos (TBS, 2001)Tsūhan Man (TV Asahi, 2002)Boku no Mahou Tsukai (NTV, 2003)Blue Moshiku wa Blue (NHK, 2003)Stand Up!! (TBS, 2003)Ace o Nerae! (TV Asahi, 2004)Hikeshiya Komachi (NHK, 2004)Rondo (TBS, 2006)Yaoh (TBS, 2006, in episode three)Toritsu Mizusho! (NTV, 2006)Taiyou no Uta (TBS, 2006)Detective Conan (YTV, 2006)Anna-san no Omame (TV Asahi, 2006)Walkers (NHK, 2006)Nodame Cantabile Special Lesson (Europe Special) (Fuji TV, 2008)

FilmNoel (2003)Makoto (2005)Nodame Cantabile The Movie I (2009) - Tanya Vishnyova Nodame Cantabile The Movie II (2010) - Tanya Vishnyova Eight Ranger (2012) Momoko Kitoh The Last Chance: Diary of Comedians (2013) - Becky Eight Ranger 2 (2014) - Momoko KitohJK Ninja Girls (2017)A Gambler's Odyssey 2020 (2019)First Love (2019), Julie

Japanese dub
Live-actionSon of the Mask (2005), Tonya Avery (Traylor Howard)Teenage Mutant Ninja Turtles (2014), April O'Neil (Megan Fox)The Mummy (2017), Ahmanet (Sofia Boutella)
AnimationDonkey Kong Country (1999), Dixie KongOswald (2001), DaisyThe Simpsons Movie (2007), Lisa Simpson (Theatrical release)Monsters vs. Aliens (2009), Susan Murphy/Ginormica

Discography
In addition to her work as an actress and model, Becky has also had several musical releases. Beginning in late 2009, Becky began recording under the name , and her first single under EMI Music Japan debuted in the top 10 of the Oricon's Daily and Weekly Charts.

Albums

Singles

Other appearancesAct4 (8 December 2004)
Features the songs "Himawari", "Deco Boco", and "Chocorate" off of her single "Himawari"Tribute to Avril Lavigne: Master's Collection (25 October 2006)
Track 10: "Sk8er Boi"Yesterday Once More: Tribute to the Carpenters''
Track 6: "Sing"

Awards

References

External links
Official Sun Music website 
Official EMI Music Japan profile 

1984 births
Living people
Actresses from Kanagawa Prefecture
Japanese women pop singers
Japanese people of English descent
Japanese television personalities
Japanese voice actresses
Musicians from Kanagawa Prefecture
People who lost British citizenship
Asia University (Japan) alumni
20th-century Japanese women singers
20th-century Japanese singers
21st-century Japanese women singers
21st-century Japanese singers
21st-century Japanese actresses